Eric James Byrnes (born February 16, 1976), is a baseball analyst and former professional baseball outfielder. He played in Major League Baseball (MLB) for the Oakland Athletics, Colorado Rockies, Baltimore Orioles, Arizona Diamondbacks, and Seattle Mariners. Byrnes retired from playing in 2010 and was an analyst for MLB Network until 2021.

Byrnes was considered a player who relied on his speed and hustle. He could hit for power, but tended to be a "free-swinger" and went through hitting droughts. Byrnes was ranked in the top-three for best defensive left fielders in John Dewan's publication, Fielding Bible. Byrnes was selected to the All-Time great Oakland A's 50th Season team in 2018.

Amateur career

High school
Byrnes' high school career was spent in the West Catholic Athletic League, where he played for St. Francis High School in Mountain View, California. Byrnes regularly competed in baseball and football against Serra High School's Tom Brady, and Bellarmine College Prep's Pat Burrell. After graduating in 1994, he was selected in the 1994 Major League Baseball draft by the Los Angeles Dodgers but elected to go to college at the University of California at Los Angeles (UCLA).

College
At UCLA (1995–98), Byrnes hit second in the batting order and played right field in a lineup that featured future major-league stars Troy Glaus (1995–97) and Garrett Atkins (1998). In 1995, Byrnes played collegiate summer baseball in the Cape Cod Baseball League for the Chatham A's, and in 1996 and 1997 for the league's Hyannis Mets. He was again selected in the Major League Baseball Draft, this time by the Houston Astros after his junior season, but again elected to stay in school. Byrnes finished his UCLA career as one of the most successful hitters in Pac-10 history, with a .331 career average and 75 doubles — a conference record. Byrnes was inducted into the UCLA Athletics Hall of Fame, in 2013.

Professional career

Oakland Athletics
Byrnes was selected in the 8th round of the 1998 Major League Baseball draft by the Oakland Athletics. In the 1998 season, he played for the short-season Southern Oregon Timberjacks, and the Class-A Advanced Visalia Oaks in the A's organization where he batted a combined .357 with 19 doubles, 4 triples, 11 home runs, 52 runs batted in (RBI), and 17 stolen bases. In 1999, Byrnes continued to play in the A's minor leagues. That season, he played for the Class-A Advanced Modesto A's, and the Double-A Midland RockHounds and in 139 combined games, Byrnes batted .306 with 42 doubles, 1 triple, 7 home runs, 88 RBI, and 34 stolen bases. Byrnes made his major league debut on August 22, against the Cleveland Indians. He went 2-for-4 with a stolen base in his first games, playing designated hitter, and batting seventh in the batting order. Byrnes batted .300 his first season, with three hits in ten at-bats. The next season, Byrnes played 19 games with the A's. He hit his first home run of his major league career on June 9, 2001, against the San Francisco Giants. He batted .237 with one double, three home runs, five RBIs, and one stolen base with the A's in 2001. Byrnes played two games in the 2001 American League Division Series against the New York Yankees, going hitless in two at-bats.

Byrnes was also involved in a 2003 baseball game that included two significant base running gaffes in a single inning. With a chance to close out the Boston Red Sox, the Athletics had a potential rally stifled by two controversial plays. Byrnes was tagged out after failing to touch home plate after a collision with catcher Jason Varitek, who had blocked the plate before attempting to catch the ball. After the collision, a hobbling Byrnes shoved Varitek and began walking back to the dugout. Varitek picked up the ball and tagged Byrnes out. This play was then followed up by Red Sox third baseman Bill Mueller running into Miguel Tejada as Byrnes was rounding third (later in the same inning). Tejada then stopped running home and was eventually tagged out; the umpires called Tejada out because he was tagged as a result of not attempting to advance home, not because of the obstruction by the third baseman.

On June 29, 2003, Byrnes hit for the cycle. In 2004, Byrnes had his best year with the A's, batting .283 with 20 home runs and 73 RBI.

Colorado Rockies
On July 13, 2005, Byrnes, along with prospect Omar Quintanilla, was traded to the Colorado Rockies for pitchers Joe Kennedy and Jay Witasick. In 15 games with the Rockies, Byrnes batted .189 with 2 doubles, 5 RBI, and 2 stolen bases.

Baltimore Orioles
A little over two weeks later, and a day before the trading deadline, on July 30, 2005, Byrnes was traded to the Baltimore Orioles for outfielder Larry Bigbie. On August 15, 2005, Byrnes and the Orioles traveled to Oakland, marking the first time Byrnes played against his former team. After struggling against right-handed pitchers, the Orioles benched Byrnes and questioned his ability to be an every-day player. In 52 games with the Orioles that season, Byrnes batted .192 with 7 doubles, 1 triple, 3 home runs, 11 RBI, and 3 stolen bases. In his combined totals that season between the Oakland Athletics, the Colorado Rockies, and the Orioles, Byrnes batted .231 with 22 doubles, 3 triples, 10 home runs, 35 RBI, and 5 stolen bases in 111 games.

Arizona Diamondbacks
After the 2005 season, Byrnes was granted free agency. On December 30, 2005, Byrnes signed a one-year, $2.25 million contract with the Arizona Diamondbacks. Byrnes stated that he was excited for the opportunity to play center field regularly. In 2006, Byrnes batted .267 with 37 doubles, 3 triples, 26 home runs, 79 RBI, and 25 stolen bases. His 26 home runs led the Diamondbacks, as did his stolen bases, and his slugging percentage of .482.

Midway through the 2007 season, Byrnes was rewarded with a three-year, $30 million contract extension with the Arizona Diamondbacks. Byrnes is one of a few players to have 50 stolen bases and hit 20 home runs in one season, having accomplished the feat in 2007. At the end on the 2007 season, Byrnes batted .286 with 30 doubles, 8 triples, 21 home runs, 83 RBI, and 50 stolen bases in 160 games. He led the Diamondbacks in doubles, RBI, stolen bases, caught stealing (7), and total bases (288). Byrnes was also 11 in National League Most Valuable Player Award voting, with 43 voting points. He was honored with a Fielding Bible Award as the best fielding left fielder in MLB.

On May 27, 2008, Byrnes was placed on the 15-day disabled list for the 1st time in his career with sore hamstrings. Byrnes underwent an MRI that showed he had tears in both of his hamstrings. Byrnes returned to the team on June 23, 2008, batting leadoff against the Boston Red Sox at Fenway Park. At the end of the 2008 season, Byrnes batted .209 with 13 doubles, 1 triple, 6 home runs, 24 RBI, and 4 stolen bases in 52 games.

On June 25, Byrnes was placed on the disabled list with broken left hand. He was injured during a game against the Texas Rangers after opposing pitcher Scott Feldman hit Byrnes on the hand with a pitch. After he sustained the injury, he was replaced by Ryan Roberts. He was reinstated from the disabled list on September 5, 2009. He played 16 minor league games during his rehab stint with the Triple-A Reno Aces, batting .279 with seven doubles, one triple, two home runs, nine RBIs, and one stolen base. On January 15, 2010, Byrnes was designated for assignment by the Arizona Diamondbacks to make room on the 40-man roster for Adam LaRoche.

Seattle Mariners
Byrnes had shown interest in joining the San Francisco Giants after he was designated for assignment by the Diamondbacks, however, on January 29, 2010, Byrnes signed a one-year, $400,000 contract with the Seattle Mariners. To make room for Byrnes on the 40-man roster, the Mariners designated first baseman Tommy Everidge for assignment. The Diamondbacks were still responsible for the remaining $11 million on his contract he had with them before being released. Byrnes was slated to share playing time in the outfield with Milton Bradley at the time of his signing. Byrnes said this about being signed by the Mariners:

On April 30, 2010, in the 11th inning of the Mariners game versus the Rangers with Ichiro Suzuki on third base, manager Don Wakamatsu gave Byrnes the signal for a suicide squeeze. Brynes was ordered to bunt on any pitch he saw, but as the pitch came to him, he inexplicably pulled his bat away, leaving Ichiro to be tagged out at home. After the game concluded with yet another Mariners loss, Byrnes stormed out of the clubhouse and out of Safeco Field on his bicycle, passing General Manager Jack Zduriencik in a fury. He would be released two days later.

Byrnes was released by the Mariners on May 2, 2010 after batting .094 with three hits in 32 at-bats, one run scored, two doubles, nine strikeouts, and six bases on balls in 15 games on the season with Seattle. In a press release by the Mariners, general manager Jack Zduriencik said that, "Eric Byrnes is a tremendous competitor and a credit to baseball. We wish him only the best and expect him to land on his feet."

Retirement and Savannah Bananas
On May 13, 2010, Byrnes announced his retirement from Major League Baseball. He currently lives in a closed community at Half Moon Bay, California, with his wife Tarah and daughter; Byrnes plays slow pitch softball and golf. He is also a passionate trail runner. He earned $11 million in 2010. Byrnes has served as the team manager for the Savannah Bananas, an exhibition baseball team based in Savannah, Georgia, since 2021.

Broadcasting career
During the 2006 post-season, Byrnes was an analyst for ESPN's Baseball Tonight show. He has also appeared on Fox's baseball pre-game show and The Best Damn Sports Show Period talk show. Byrnes was a guest analyst for the first two games of the 2006 World Series pre-game show and for some of the 2007 World Series on FOX Sports. During the off-season, he often fills in on KNBR, a San Francisco radio station. He currently resides with his wife Tarah, daughter Chloe and their bulldogs, Bruin, Mr. Hitch and Bella. During the 2007 MLB All Star Game at AT&T Park, he was in a kayak in McCovey Cove with Bruin during the pre-game and game itself for the FOX Sports broadcast.

Byrnes also has had his own TV show, called "The Eric Byrnes Show," which aired on FSN Arizona during the Diamondbacks' regular season. The show featured behind-the-scenes looks at the Arizona Diamondbacks, as well as Byrnes' personal life. During the 2007 off-season, Byrnes began a weekly radio show on XM Satellite Radio, called "Hustle with Eric Byrnes."

Byrnes worked in the booth with ESPN for the 2010 College World Series and was a contributor to the MLB Network. He departed the network in January 2021.

On March 18, 2011, Byrnes was hired by KNBR to host a nightly talk show, holding the 7–10 pm slot, as well as doing a Giants post-game show. Byrnes began his talk show on March 23, 2011. Now Byrnes occasionally co-hosts the Mr. T. show with Tom Tolbert, and Ray Ratto. As of 2013, Byrnes also works as an analyst for select Pac-12 Network baseball games.

Other accomplishments

On April 22–23, 2019, Byrnes set a new Guinness Book of World Records mark for most holes of golf in a single day, 420 holes.

See also
 List of Major League Baseball players to hit for the cycle

References

External links

1976 births
Living people
Arizona Diamondbacks players
Baltimore Orioles players
Baseball players from California
Chatham Anglers players
Colorado Rockies players
Hyannis Harbor Hawks players
Major League Baseball broadcasters
Major League Baseball left fielders
Midland RockHounds players
MLB Network personalities
Modesto A's players
Oakland Athletics players
People from Redwood City, California
Reno Aces players
Sacramento River Cats players
Seattle Mariners players
Southern Oregon Timberjacks players
UCLA Bruins baseball players
University of California, Los Angeles alumni
Visalia Oaks players